Aleksandr Vitalyevich Iaremchuk (born 19 February 1995) is a Russian cross-country skier, para-biathlete and para-athlete.

Career
Iaremchuk represented Russia at the 2014 Winter Paralympics in the biathlon and cross-country skiing.

He also competes in the Summer Paralympics. He represented Russian Paralympic Committee athletes at the 2020 Summer Paralympics in the 1500 metres T46 event and won a gold medal.

Personal life
Iaremchuk lost his left arm around the age of seven. He took up athletics aged 13. He has two sons with his wife Anastasia: Yermil (born 2017) and Arseny (born 2021).

References

1995 births
Living people
Paralympic biathletes of Russia
Paralympic cross-country skiers of Russia
Medalists at the World Para Athletics Championships
Medalists at the World Para Athletics European Championships
Biathletes at the 2014 Winter Paralympics
Cross-country skiers at the 2014 Winter Paralympics
Athletes (track and field) at the 2020 Summer Paralympics
Medalists at the 2020 Summer Paralympics
Paralympic medalists in athletics (track and field)
People from Ustyansky District
Paralympic gold medalists for the Russian Paralympic Committee athletes
Russian male middle-distance runners
Sportspeople from Arkhangelsk Oblast